| tries = {{#expr: 
 + 16 +  4 +  6 + 10 +  9 + 12 + 14 +  5 +  5 +  0 +  4 +  9 +  7 +  7
 + 17 +  9 +  6 +  1 +  6 +  7 + 12 +  8 + 12 +  6 +  8 + 10 +  8 +  7
 +  3 +  7 +  3 +  5 +  4 +  2 +  9 +  6
 +  8 +  2 +  4 +  5 +  9 +  6 +  2 +  8
 +  4 +  5 +  5 +  1 +  4 +  2 +  2 +  4
 +  5 +  4 +  5 +  7
 +  4
}}
| top point scorer = 
| top try scorer = 
| venue = Kassam Stadium, Oxford
| attendance2 = 7,230
| champions =  Sale Sharks 
| count = 2
| runner-up =   Pau
| website = https://web.archive.org/web/20080506141030/http://www.ercrugby.com/eng/
| previous year = 2003–04
| previous tournament = 2003–04 Parker Pen Challenge Cup
| next year = 2005–06
| next tournament = 2005–06 European Challenge Cup
}}
The 2004–05 European Challenge Cup (known as the Parker Pen Challenge Cup for sponsorship reasons) was the ninth season of the European Challenge Cup, Europe's second-tier club rugby union competition below the Heineken Cup. A total of 28 teams participated, representing seven countries.

The competition began with a series of matches on 23 October 2004 and culminated in the final at the Kassam Stadium in Oxford on 21 May 2005.

As in the previous two seasons, the competition was organised in a knockout format. Teams played each other on a home and away basis, with the aggregate points winner proceeding to the next round. The final was a single leg. This was the final season with a pure knockout format; in subsequent seasons the competition reverted to a pool stage followed by a knockout.

For the third and final time, a third tier tournament was held - the European Shield. This was contested between the first round losers from the European Challenge Cup.  As there were only 28 teams involved, the 2 "best" 1st Round losers were reprieved and proceeded to the 2nd Round.

The defending champions, England's NEC Harlequins, did not have a chance to defend their crown because they qualified to play in the Heineken Cup.  Sale Sharks claimed a comfortable victory over Pau in the final and picked up their second piece of European Club silverware.

Teams
The allocation of teams was as follows:
England: 5 teams — all teams from the Zurich Premiership that did not qualify for the 2004–05 Heineken Cup
France:  10 teams — all teams from the Top 16 that did not qualify for the Heineken Cup
Ireland: 1 team — the Irish team from the Celtic League that did not play in the Heineken Cup
Italy: 8 teams — all the teams from the Super 10 that did not qualify for the Heineken Cup
Portugal: 1 team
Scotland: 1 team — the Scottish team from the Celtic League that did not play in the Heineken Cup
Spain: 2 teams — drawn from the División de Honor de Rugby

Matches
All kickoff times are local to the match location.

Round 1

1st Leg

2nd Leg

Aggregate Results
{| class="wikitable"
|+ Key to colours
|-
|                        |    
|14 winners and 2 best losers advance to 2nd Round.
|-
|style="background:#cfc;"|    
|12 other teams to Shield.
|}

Round 2

1st Leg

2nd Leg

Aggregate Results

Quarter-finals

1st Leg

2nd Leg

Aggregate Results

Semi-finals

1st Leg

2nd Leg

Aggregate Results

Final

See also
2004-05 Heineken Cup
European Challenge Cup
2004–05 European Shield

References

 
2004–05 rugby union tournaments for clubs
2004-05
2004–05 in European rugby union
2004–05 in English rugby union
2004–05 in French rugby union
2004–05 in Irish rugby union
2004–05 in Italian rugby union
2004–05 in Spanish rugby union
2004–05 in Scottish rugby union
rugby union
rugby union